Jaqué is a corregimiento in Chepigana District, Darién Province, Panama, located  west of the Panama-Colombia border.

Transportation
Jaqué is within the Darién Gap of the Pan American Highway, and no permanent roads connect it with the rest of Panama. The main means of travel are by plane and by boat. The town is served by the Jaqué Airport.

Geography
Jaqué is on the Pacific coast next to the mouth of the Jaqué River in Darién Province. The immediate area around Jaqué is mainly low lying with mangrove swamps and tropical rain forest. Further inland are highlands with temperate broadleaf and mixed forests.

Climate
Jaqué has a tropical monsoon climate (Köppen climate classification Am). The dry starts in January lasting until March. On average there are 114 days with rain a year. Humidity is usually high at or above 80 percent year round with an average of 85.8% a year. March being the lowest at 81.6 percent during the dry season, and September being higher at 88.2% during the wet season.

Demographics
Jaqué had a population of 2,386 as of 2010; with an estimated population of 2,882 in 2015 Its population as of 1990 was 1,819; its population as of 2000 was 2,244.

References

Corregimientos of Darién Province
Populated places in Darién Province
Road-inaccessible communities of Panama